

The Kunstgewerbemuseum, or Museum of Decorative Arts, is an internationally important museum of the decorative arts in Berlin, Germany, part of the Staatliche Museen zu Berlin (Berlin State Museums). The collection is split between the Kunstgewerbemuseum building at the Kulturforum  and Köpenick Palace

History
It was founded in 1868 as the Deutsches Gewerbe-Museum zu Berlin, and originally had a teaching institute as well as a public museum. The collection grew significantly in the 1870s, and it was renamed Kunstgewerbemuseum in 1879.  In 1881 it relocated into the Martin-Gropius-Bau – where Priam's Treasure was also on display for a time – and in 1921 it moved into the Stadtschloss.

Parts of the collection were destroyed in World War II, and the surviving items were split between East and West Berlin. The Eastern collection moved into Köpenick Palace in 1963, while the Western exhibits moved first into Charlottenburg Palace, then into the new museum building in the Kulturforum in 1985, built by Rolf Gutbrod.

Exhibition

The Kunstgewerbemuseum displays European (and Byzantine) decorative arts from all post-classical periods of art history, and features gold, silver, glass and enamel items, porcelain, furniture, panelling, tapestry, costumes, and silks. There is a very important collection of Late Antique objects in many media. The items from the Middle Ages include a large number of gold reliquaries (including the reliquary arm of St. Caesarius). The Renaissance is represented by silverware from the city councillors of Lüneburg, and bronze sculptures, tapestries, furniture, Venetian glasses and maiolicas from the Italian princely courts.

The Baroque era is represented by faiences from Delft, and glass items. There is also European porcelain (particularly from Meissen and the Royal Manufacturer of Berlin), and decorative crockery from the rococo, classicist, historicist and Art Nouveau styles. The "New Collection" of 20th century craftwork includes industrially-manufactured products.

See also 
 Cloth of St Gereon, the second oldest European wall tapestry still existing

Notes

External links

 Homepage in English

Art museums and galleries in Germany
Museums in Berlin
Art museums established in 1868
Decorative arts museums in Germany
Textile museums
1868 establishments in Prussia
Berlin State Museums